Armando Jesús “Chiri” Mendez Alcorta (born 31 March 1996) is a Uruguayan professional footballer who plays as a right-back for Newell's Old Boys.

Career

In 2019, Méndez returned from Fenix to Nacional, where he became known as "Hulk" to his teammates due to his intense weight training and protein diet, which included eating ten eggs a day. He attributed his quick jump to the Nacional first team to his weight training.

On 7 January 2022, Méndez joined Argentine club Newell's Old Boys on a deal until the end of 2024.

References

External links

Living people
1996 births
Uruguayan footballers
Uruguayan expatriate footballers
Association football defenders
Peñarol players
Club Atlético River Plate (Montevideo) players
Centro Atlético Fénix players
Newell's Old Boys footballers
Uruguayan Primera División players
Uruguayan expatriate sportspeople in Argentina
Expatriate footballers in Argentina